Langen, van Langen or von Langen is a surname. Notable people with the surname include:

 Birgit Collin-Langen (born 1956), German politician
 Carl Freiherr von Langen (1887–1934), German horse rider who competed in the 1928 Summer Olympics
 Christoph Langen (born 1962), German bobsledder
 Dexter Langen (born 1980), German footballer
 Dirk Reinhard Adelbert van Langen (1898-1983), a member of the Chief of Staff of the Royal Netherlands East Indies Army
 Ellen van Langen (born 1966), Dutch athlete
 Eugen Langen (1833–1895), German entrepreneur, engineer and inventor, involved in the development of the petrol engine and the Wuppertal monorail
 Ivar Langen (born 1942), rector at the University of Stavanger in Norway
 Joseph Langen (1837–1901), German theologian
 Odin Elsford Stanley Langen (1913–1976), U.S. Representative from Minnesota
 Philipp Langen (born 1986), German footballer
 Rudolph von Langen (1438 or 1439–1519), German Catholic divine, who helped introduced Humanistic ideas to the town of Munster
 Werner Langen (born 1949), German politician and Member of the European Parliament 

Surnames of Dutch origin